Bastilla vitiensis is a moth of the family Noctuidae first described by Arthur Gardiner Butler in 1886. It is found from the Moluccas to Palau, Fiji, Samoa, Tonga and New Caledonia, Sulawesi, the Philippines, Borneo and Java.

Larvae have been recorded on Eucalyptus and Hibiscus, but this is atypical for the genus and needs verification.

References

External links

Bastilla (moth)
Moths described in 1886